is a passenger railway station located in the town of Matsuno, Kitauwa District, Ehime Prefecture, Japan. It is operated by JR Shikoku and has the station number "G37".

Lines

Layout
The station consists of two opposed side platforms serving two tracks. One platform is connected to a station building which is unstaffed and serves as a waiting room. An overhead bridge leads across the tracks to the other platform which has a passenger shelter.

Adjacent stations

|-
!colspan=5|JR Shikoku

History
The station became the new terminus and was given the name . With the nationalization of Uwajima Railway on 1 August 1933, the station came under the control of Japanese Government Railways (JGR), later corporatised as Japan National Railways (JNR) and was renamed . On 26 March 1953, it became a through-station when the line was extended to .With the privatization of JNR on 1 April 1987, control passed to JR Shikoku.

Surrounding area
former Yoshinobu town hall
Hiromi River

See also
 List of railway stations in Japan

References

External links
timetable

Railway stations in Ehime Prefecture
Yodo Line
Railway stations in Japan opened in 1923
Matsuno, Ehime